The National Conservative Club was a short-lived political London gentlemen's club founded in 1886. It was aligned to the Conservative party, with members having to pledge support. It was launched as a rival to the mass-membership National Liberal Club of the opposing Liberal party, but proved highly unsuccessful. According to Whitaker's Almanack, it had 2,500 members in 1890, but at a third of the National Liberal Club's membership, this was less than expected, and the NCC closed before the end of the century.

Notes

See also
List of London's gentlemen's clubs

1886 establishments in the United Kingdom
Gentlemen's clubs in London